is a Japanese football player for Kataller Toyama.

Club statistics
Updated to 23 February 2020.

References

External links
Profile at Kataller Toyama
Profile at Matsumoto Yamaga

1995 births
Living people
Association football people from Saitama Prefecture
Japanese footballers
J1 League players
J2 League players
J3 League players
Matsumoto Yamaga FC players
J.League U-22 Selection players
Kataller Toyama players
Association football forwards